Abu Hasan Ali ibn Umar ibn Ahmad ibn Mahdi al-Daraqutni (918 CE — 995 CE) was a 10th-century muhaddith best known for compiling the hadith collection Sunan al-Daraqutni. He was celebrated later  by Sunni hadith scholars such as the "imam of his time" and the "amir al-mu'minin in hadith".

Biography

Birth
Al-Daraqutni was born in c. 918 CE/306 AH in the Dar al-Qutn quarter of Baghdad, whence he got his nisba.

Education
Al-Daraqutni grew up in a house of knowledge and virtue, as his father was one of the trustworthy Hadith transmitters, and he watched him in his youth frequenting the circles of knowledge and hearing, memorizing his audios and narrations, and spending the clouds of his day learning and studying. His studies were initially largely restricted to his native Iraq, where he frequented Wasit, Basra and Kufa. Later in life, he travelled to Syria and Egypt and while in the latter, he enjoyed the patronage of the Ikhishid vizier Jafar bin al-Fadl for assisting him with compiling his own hadith collection.

Teachers
His teachers in his period include
 Ibn Hibban
 The son of Abu Dawood
 Abu al-Qasim al-Baghawi 
 Ibn Mujahid, from whom he learned the different recitations of the Quran
 Abu Sa'id al-Istakhri

Students
His students included the hadith scholars:
 Al-Hakim al-Nishapuri
 Abu Nu'aym al-Isfahani
 Abu Dharr al-Harawi
 Al-Baqillani
 Muhammad bin Husayn al-Sulami

Death
He died in 995 CE/385 AH and was buried in the Bab al-Dayr cemetery in Baghdad, near the grave of Maruf Karkhi.

Theological position
Al-Daraqutni was a committed follower of the Shafi‘i school, studying jurisprudence under the Shafi'ite scholar Abu Sa'id al-Istakhri. Al-Daraqutni was not a fan of kalam and did not engage in theological discussions. This position is not unique as many Ash'ari scholars such as Ibn al-Salah and Al-Suyuti held similar positions. However, he supported the kalam of Ahlu Sunnah and this is evident based on his support for Al-Baqillani refuting against Mu'tazilah and Karramiyya. His story with Al-Baqillani dispenses with prolongation in proving his adherence to the Ash'ari school.  

He wrote a treatise against Muʿtazilite Amr ibn Ubayd on the subject of anthropomorphic narrations in relation to God's attributes and defending the ambiguous texts by providing evidence for its authenticity. According to Ibn al-Jawzi's book entitled Mirat al Zamanwzi, Al-Daraqutni considered Ibn Qutayba to be one of the innovators whose beliefs leaned towards anthropomorphism attributing direction, shape and image to God. He also claimed that Ibn Qutayba showed enmity to Ahl al-Bayt.

Works 
Several of al-Daraqutni's extant works have been published:

General hadith works 

al-Sunan, his primary hadith collection.
Kitab al-du'afa wa-l-matrukin, an alphabetically ordered list of 632 hadith transmitters considered to be da'if or rejected.
al-'Ilal al-warida fi al-ahadith
al-Mukhtalif wa-l mu'talif fi asma al-rijal, a list of hadith transmitters who names are similar in spelling but differ in pronunciation.

Works on Sahih al-Bukhari and Sahih Muslim 
Al-Daraqutni wrote a series of commentaries, addendums and analyses of narrations contained within Sahih al-Bukhari and Sahih Muslim. 
Dhikr asma' al-tabi'in wa-man ba'dahum mimman sahhat riwayatuhuu min al-thiqat 'ind Muhammad ibn Isma'il al-Bukhari
Dhikr asma' al-tabi'in wa-man ba'dahum mimman sahhat riwayatuhu 'ind Muslim
al-Ilzamat ala sahiay al-Bukhari, a compilation of 109 narrations whose chains of narration, according to al-Daraqutni, satisfy the requirements for inclusion in Sahih al-Bukhari and Sahih Muslim.
Asma al-sahaba allati ittafaqa fiha al-Bukhari wa-Muslim wa-ma infarada bihi kull minhuma
Kitab al-tatabbu'''Kitab fi dhikr riwayat al-sahihayn Kitab al-tattabu 
In his Kitab al-tatabbu', al-Daraqutni reviews 217 narrations within the two collections which he deems to be flawed using both isnad and matn criticism. Reasons given include the isnad not meeting the requirements for inclusion in the collections, and the commentary of the hadith's transmitters being inadvertently merged with its matn. Jonathan A. C. Brown cautions that the work is an adjustment to the two collections rather than an attack on their overall integrity.

 Works on theology 

 Kitāb as-sifāt, a collection of hadiths concerning the attributes of God.
 Kitab al-Ru'ya, a collection of hadiths concerning the vision of Allah on the Day of Judgement.
 Ahadith An-Nuzūl, a collection of hadiths concerning the descent (nuzūl) of Allah from the heavens.

 Other 

 Kitab al-qira'at'', a work on the different recitations of the Quran.

See also 
 List of Ash'aris and Maturidis

References 

Shafi'is
Asharis
Hadith compilers
People from Baghdad
Hadith scholars
Mujaddid
910s births
995 deaths
Year of birth uncertain
10th-century jurists
Biographical evaluation scholars
Sunni imams